The artistic heritage of Taiwan is extremely diverse with multiple major influences and periods. Today Taiwan is one of the world's most significant art markets.

History 

Stonecutters of the Changbin culture began to make art on Taiwan at least 30,000 years ago. Around 5,000 years ago jade and earthenware works started to appear. Between 4000 BC and 2000 BC people in what is now Hualien produced and traded valuable jade ornaments and jewelry. The Dapenkeng culture developed a unique style of pottery. For centuries much of the art produced was religious with highly decorated temples being the beneficiaries of local wealth and education.

Art was first institutionalized in Taiwan during the Japanese colonial period with the establishment of public schools dedicated to the fine arts. The Japanese introduced oil and watercolor paintings to Taiwan and Taiwanese artists were heavily influenced by their Japanese counterparts. As was typical of colonial rulers the Japanese did not establish tertiary institutions for art education in Taiwan, all students wishing to pursue an advanced degree in the arts had to travel to Japan to do so.

In the 1920s the New Cultural Movement influenced a generation of artists who used art as a way to demonstrate their equality with, or even their superiority over, their colonizers.

When the Nationalists fled to Taiwan in 1949 they brought many of China’s most prestigious artists and a large portion of the former Qing Imperial art collection with them. The artists Huang Chun-pi, Pu Ru, and Chang Dai-chien who all came to Taiwan during this period are collectively known as the “three masters from across the strait.” The Nationalists also established the first art colleges and universities in Taiwan. Along with Chinese influences the Nationalists also allowed the United States to establish a series of military bases in Taiwan, American pop culture and artistic ideas such as abstract expressionism were introduced to Taiwan by the Americans. Schools such as the May Art Association, a revolutionary art group, and Eastern Art Association, an avant-garde group flourished during this time. The Ton-Fan group, founded in Taipei in 1956 by eight artists, brought abstraction to Taiwan. The Ton-Fan group reacted to Government disapproval of avant-garde art by championing it.

The next major influence came when the ROC left the United Nations in 1971, this unmooring from the international community caused artists to search for an identity and a sense of self, a search which continues up to the present. Artists of this era such as Lee Shi-chi and Shiy De-jinn adopted Taiwanese folk motifs and other elements from Taiwan’s traditional culture however the Taiwanese art scene still chafed under the KMT’s military dictatorship.

Democratization in the late 1980s and the lifting of martial law granted Taiwanese artists freedom of expression for the first time in history. The end of military rule allowed the Taiwanese to access films, literature, philosophy and culture from abroad which had been denied to them or censored. Artists and activists began to grapple with the legacy of authoritarianism and embraced things like queer culture which had been oppressed under the dictatorship. The economic boom of the '80s and ‘90s also saw the financial resources of Taiwanese museums and patrons increase significantly. As Taiwan’s art scene matured there began to be a greater specialization in exhibit spaces with dedicated museums for things like photography and ceramics opening.

After the end of single party rule indigenous Taiwanese artists and groups began exploring and rediscovering their cultural heritage, this revival also led to a larger social embrace of indigenous culture. In the 21st century Taiwan’s artistic community embraced new technologies and new mediums. The Taiwanese government has begun to champion and highlight Aboriginal art. An indigenous artist is selected to represent Taiwan for the first time at the Venice Biennale in 2021.

Many contemporary Taiwanese artists grapple with issues of globalization in their work. LGBTQ artists in modern Taiwan enjoy a degree of freedom denied in other Asian countries. This has made Taiwan a haven and a hub for both domestic and international LGBTQ artists. Its freedoms have also made it a safe haven for artists like Kacey Wong fleeing an increasingly oppressive environment in Hong Kong.

Art market

Art collecting has a long tradition in Taiwan however most important and deep-pocketed Taiwanese collectors prefer to fly under the radar. Taiwanese collectors are significant buyers of Chinese contemporary art as well as antiquities. Both Sotheby’s and Christie’s routinely tour the highlights of their spring and autumn Impressionist and Modern and postwar sales in Taipei. Taiwanese collectors have significant presence both at home and abroad, Taiwanese billionaire collector Pierre Chen is auction house Sotheby’s go-to guarantor for big-ticket items. Taiwanese-German collector Maria Chen-Tu is one of the largest collectors of German art and is also active in Taiwan. In 2019 more than three hundred million dollars worth of artwork that she had loaned for exhibition in China went missing.

By 1990 the Taiwanese art market was the biggest in Asia and served as a regional hub. By 2000 Hong Kong and Taiwan held comparable shares of the market. In 2006 Tamsui, an oil painting by Tan Ting-pho, was purchased in 2006 for $4.5 million (NT$144 million), setting a world record for an oil painting by an ethnically Chinese artist. In the 21st century while no longer the largest art market in Asia (having been surpassed by China) the tastes of Taiwan’s collectors have matured and Taiwan remains the most cutting-edge art market in Asia. After 2010 the art collecting market underwent significant diversification with a large number of young buyers entering the market and driving trends. In 2019 art sales in Taiwan stood at $225.4 million. The art market in Taiwan is centered in Taipei which remains an Asian leading art hub. During the COVID-19 crisis the deep pool of collectors in Taipei helped the art market sustain itself.

Taiwanese art, especially contemporary Taiwanese art, is seen as highly collectable and there is significant international demand for it. The Taiwanese government has worked to support domestic artists on the international stage.

Wood carving 
Wood carving has a long history on Taiwan. After the deforestation of much of Taiwan’s camphor forests a local industry emerged of excavating and then carving the remaining tree stumps.

The town of Sanyi, Miaoli is the current center of the Taiwanese wood carving industry. Many of the wood carvers in Sanyi are concentrated on Shuimei Street. The Sanyi Wood Sculpture Museum exhibits a wide range of wood art.

Much of the timber from illegal logging in Taiwan ends up in the local wood carving industry. Cheap pieces which imitate Taiwanese masters are imported from China and Southeast Asia which cuts into the local industry. Wood art made in Taiwan can be issued a certification from the Taiwan Wood-carving Association.

Religious art 
Taiwan’s traditional temples are home to unique artwork which represents the height of art for its time. Much of the wealth in traditional Taiwanese society went into buying and decorating temples and tombs. In particular the doors of buddhist and taoist temples are often exquisitely carved and painted with many in Taiwan depicting Guan Yu. These traditional temples have often been damaged by years of smoke of from burning incense and joss paper, as a result they often require costly restoration work.

Many of Taiwan’s traditional tombs are carved from stone with generations of artisans from stone crafting villages in Huian County, Fujian traveling to Taiwan to build tombs and temples. Chiang Hsin was the most famous of these artisans.

Christian art has a significant history in Taiwan.

Performing arts

The Taiwanese government believes that "A country’s level of democracy is reflected in the development of its performing arts."

Completed in 2018 National Kaohsiung Center for the Arts is the largest performing arts center in the world.

Glove puppetry

Glove puppetry has a long history in Taiwan and is considered one of the country's traditional arts.

See also
Japanese art
Chinese art
American art
Eslite Gallery

References